Kaia Kanepi was the defending champion but chose not to compete. 
Anastasia Pivovarova defeated Arantxa Rus in the final 7–6(7–4), 6–7(3–7), 6–2.

Seeds

Draw

Finals

Top half

Bottom half

References
Main Draw
Qualifying Singles

Open International Feminin Midi-Pyrenees Saint-Gaudens Comminges - Singles